Cao Shuo (born October 8, 1991) is a Chinese track and field athlete who specialises in the triple jump. He was born in Hebei.  His personal bests were both set in 2012, outdoors, his personal best is 17.35 m, while his indoor personal best is 17.01 m.  He competed at both the 2012 and 2016 Olympics.  In Rio, he finished in 4th place.

Competition record

References

Living people
1991 births
Chinese male triple jumpers
Athletes from Hebei
Athletes (track and field) at the 2012 Summer Olympics
Athletes (track and field) at the 2016 Summer Olympics
Olympic athletes of China
Asian Games gold medalists for China
Asian Games bronze medalists for China
Asian Games medalists in athletics (track and field)
Athletes (track and field) at the 2010 Asian Games
Athletes (track and field) at the 2014 Asian Games
Athletes (track and field) at the 2018 Asian Games
World Athletics Championships athletes for China
Olympic male triple jumpers
Medalists at the 2010 Asian Games
Medalists at the 2014 Asian Games
Medalists at the 2018 Asian Games